The Spirochaetaceae are a family of spirochete bacteria. Some species within this family are known to causes syphilis, Lyme disease, relapsing fever, and other illnesses.

See also
 Clevelandina reticulitermitidis
 Diplocalyx calotermitidis
 Hollandina pterotermitidis
 Pillotina calotermitidis

References

Spirochaetes
Gram-negative bacteria